Vladimir Kerkez (born 1 March 1984 in Kranj) is a Slovenian former professional cyclist.

Major results

Road

2007
 2nd Overall The Paths of King Nikola
1st Stage 2
 2nd Overall Giro del Friuli Venezia Giulia
1st Stage 4
2008
 2nd Overall Tour de Hongrie
 5th Overall The Paths of King Nikola
2009
 1st Stage 2 The Paths of King Nikola
 1st Banja Luka–Belgrade II
2010
 1st Grand Prix Šenčur
2011
 4th Tour of Vojvodina I 
 10th GP Kranj

Cyclo-cross
2016-2017
1st  National Cyclo-cross championships

References

1984 births
Living people
Slovenian male cyclists
Sportspeople from Kranj